

Offseason 
 October 15, 1964: Bill Heath and a player to be named later were traded by the Phillies to the Chicago White Sox for Rudy May. The Phillies completed the deal by sending Joel Gibson (minors) to the White Sox on November 23.
 December 1, 1964: Danny Cater and Lee Elia were traded by the Phillies to the Chicago White Sox for Ray Herbert and Jeoff Long.
 December 3, 1964: Rudy May and Costen Shockley were traded by the Phillies to the California Angels for Bo Belinsky.
 December 22, 1964: Bobby Del Greco was purchased by the Phillies from the Milwaukee Braves.

Regular season

Season standings

Record vs. opponents

Notable transactions 
 June 14, 1965: Gus Triandos was purchased from the Phillies by the Houston Astros.
 July 10, 1965: Frank Thomas was purchased from the Phillies by the Houston Astros.
 July 12, 1965: Denny Doyle was signed as an amateur free agent by the Phillies.

Game log

|- style="background:#bfb"
| 1 || April 12 || @ Astros || 2–0 || Chris Short (1–0) || Bob Bruce (0–1) || None || 42,652 || 1–0
|- style="background:#fbb"
| 2 || April 14 || Giants || 2–5 || Gaylord Perry (1–0) || Jim Bunning (0–1) || Bob Shaw (1) || 31,922 || 1–1
|- style="background:#bbb"
| – || April 15 || Giants || colspan=6 | Postponed (rain); Makeup: July 8 as a traditional double-header
|- style="background:#bfb"
| 3 || April 17 || Dodgers || 3–2 || Chris Short (2–0) || Don Drysdale (1–1) || Jack Baldschun (1) || 17,021 || 2–1
|- style="background:#fbb"
| 4 || April 18 || Dodgers || 2–6 || Sandy Koufax (1–0) || Bo Belinsky (0–1) || None || 11,107 || 2–2
|- style="background:#bfb"
| 5 || April 19 || Astros || 8–0 || Jim Bunning (1–1) || Turk Farrell (1–1) || None || 4,668 || 3–2
|- style="background:#bfb"
| 6 || April 20 || Astros || 2–1 (13) || Jack Baldschun (1–0) || Hal Woodeshick (0–1) || None || 6,627 || 4–2
|- style="background:#fbb"
| 7 || April 21 || Astros || 4–11 || Dave Giusti (1–0) || Chris Short (2–1) || None || 8,267 || 4–3
|- style="background:#fbb"
| 8 || April 23 || @ Dodgers || 0–4 || Johnny Podres (1–0) || Jim Bunning (1–2) || None || 29,120 || 4–4
|- style="background:#fbb"
| 9 || April 24 || @ Dodgers || 3–9 || Claude Osteen (2–1) || Bo Belinsky (0–2) || None || 36,500 || 4–5
|- style="background:#bfb"
| 10 || April 25 || @ Dodgers || 6–4 || Ray Herbert (1–0) || Don Drysdale (2–2) || Jack Baldschun (2) || 25,766 || 5–5
|- style="background:#bfb"
| 11 || April 26 || @ Dodgers || 4–3 || Chris Short (3–1) || Sandy Koufax (2–1) || Jack Baldschun (3) || 24,703 || 6–5
|- style="background:#fbb"
| 12 || April 27 || @ Giants || 13–14 || Bob Shaw (1–1) || Ed Roebuck (0–1) || None || 10,705 || 6–6
|- style="background:#fbb"
| 13 || April 28 || @ Giants || 3–9 || Ron Herbel (1–0) || Ray Culp (0–1) || None || 7,922 || 6–7
|- style="background:#fbb"
| 14 || April 30 || @ Braves || 1–7 || Tony Cloninger (2–2) || Ray Herbert (1–1) || None || 2,923 || 6–8
|-

|- style="background:#fbb"
| 15 || May 1 || @ Braves || 1–6 || Wade Blasingame (1–2) || Jim Bunning (1–3) || None || 2,486 || 6–9
|- style="background:#bfb"
| 16 || May 2 (1) || @ Braves || 6–0 || Chris Short (4–1) || Denny Lemaster (1–2) || None || see 2nd game || 7–9
|- style="background:#bfb"
| 17 || May 2 (2) || @ Braves || 10–7 || Jack Baldschun (2–0) || Billy O'Dell (1–1) || None || 8,630 || 8–9
|- style="background:#fbb"
| 18 || May 4 || @ Mets || 1–2 || Al Jackson (1–3) || Ray Herbert (1–2) || None || 17,321 || 8–10
|- style="background:#bfb"
| 19 || May 5 || @ Mets || 1–0 || Jim Bunning (2–3) || Warren Spahn (2–2) || None || 14,134 || 9–10
|- style="background:#fbb"
| 20 || May 7 || Cardinals || 0–2 || Bob Gibson (5–0) || Chris Short (4–2) || None || 14,499 || 9–11
|- style="background:#bfb"
| 21 || May 8 || Cardinals || 9–8 (11) || Ray Culp (1–1) || Nelson Briles (0–1) || None || 19,596 || 10–11
|- style="background:#bfb"
| 22 || May 9 || Cardinals || 4–2 || Art Mahaffey (1–0) || Ray Sadecki (0–4) || Ed Roebuck (1) || 12,930 || 11–11
|- style="background:#bfb"
| 23 || May 10 || Cardinals || 4–2 (10) || Ed Roebuck (1–1) || Bob Purkey (1–3) || None || 14,454 || 12–11
|- style="background:#fbb"
| 24 || May 11 || Reds || 1–9 || John Tsitouris (3–2) || Chris Short (4–3) || Gerry Arrigo (1) || 12,438 || 12–12
|- style="background:#fbb"
| 25 || May 12 || Reds || 3–4 || Sammy Ellis (5–0) || Ray Culp (1–2) || Jim O'Toole (1) || 12,237 || 12–13
|- style="background:#bfb"
| 26 || May 13 || Reds || 7–6 (10) || Jack Baldschun (3–0) || Jim Duffalo (0–2) || None || 10,573 || 13–13
|- style="background:#bfb"
| 27 || May 14 || Braves || 5–2 || Art Mahaffey (2–0) || Billy O'Dell (1–2) || None || 19,629 || 14–13
|- style="background:#bfb"
| 28 || May 15 || Braves || 6–4 || Jim Bunning (3–3) || Wade Blasingame (2–4) || Jack Baldschun (4) || 8,794 || 15–13
|- style="background:#fbb"
| 29 || May 16 || Braves || 6–8 (10) || Billy O'Dell (2–2) || Jack Baldschun (3–1) || Wade Blasingame (1) || 16,632 || 15–14
|- style="background:#bfb"
| 30 || May 17 || @ Cardinals || 2–1 || Bo Belinsky (1–2) || Curt Simmons (1–5) || None || 10,748 || 16–14
|- style="background:#fbb"
| 31 || May 18 || @ Cardinals || 2–8 || Ray Sadecki (1–4) || Art Mahaffey (2–1) || None || 8,593 || 16–15
|- style="background:#fbb"
| 32 || May 19 || @ Cardinals || 6–7 || Bob Purkey (2–3) || Ed Roebuck (1–2) || None || 18,660 || 16–16
|- style="background:#fbb"
| 33 || May 20 || @ Cardinals || 2–12 || Bob Gibson (8–0) || Chris Short (4–4) || None || 13,741 || 16–17
|- style="background:#fbb"
| 34 || May 21 || @ Reds || 5–6 || Joey Jay (2–1) || Art Mahaffey (2–2) || None || 14,263 || 16–18
|- style="background:#fbb"
| 35 || May 22 || @ Reds || 4–9 || Joe Nuxhall (1–1) || Bo Belinsky (1–3) || Gerry Arrigo (2) || 21,296 || 16–19
|- style="background:#bfb"
| 36 || May 23 || @ Reds || 4–3 (10) || Ed Roebuck (2–2) || Gerry Arrigo (1–1) || None || 14,942 || 17–19
|- style="background:#fbb"
| 37 || May 24 (1) || Mets || 2–6 || Warren Spahn (4–4) || Jim Bunning (3–4) || None || see 2nd game || 17–20
|- style="background:#fbb"
| 38 || May 24 (2) || Mets || 1–4 || Frank Lary (1–0) || Chris Short (4–5) || Tug McGraw (1) ||  || 17–21
|- style="background:#bfb"
| 39 || May 25 || Mets || 10–3 || Ray Herbert (2–2) || Al Jackson (2–5) || None || 6,344 || 18–21
|- style="background:#fbb"
| 40 || May 26 || Pirates || 3–5 || Tommie Sisk (3–0) || Art Mahaffey (2–3) || None || 10,212 || 18–22
|- style="background:#bbb"
| – || May 27 || Pirates || colspan=6 | Postponed (rain and wind); Makeup: July 5 as a traditional double-header
|- style="background:#bfb"
| 41 || May 28 || Cubs || 3–1 || Ray Culp (2–2) || Bob Buhl (5–3) || Chris Short (1) || 13,663 || 19–22
|- style="background:#bfb"
| 42 || May 29 || Cubs || 4–2 || Jim Bunning (4–4) || Larry Jackson (3–5) || None || 4,962 || 20–22
|- style="background:#fbb"
| 43 || May 30 || Cubs || 1–4 || Dick Ellsworth (6–3) || Ray Herbert (2–3) || None || 11,696 || 20–23
|- style="background:#fbb"
| 44 || May 31 || @ Pirates || 2–5 || Don Cardwell (2–2) || Chris Short (4–6) || Al McBean (8) || 16,366 || 20–24
|-

|- style="background:#fbb"
| 45 || June 1 || @ Pirates || 0–4 || Bob Veale (5–2) || Art Mahaffey (2–4) || None || 10,478 || 20–25
|- style="background:#bbb"
| – || June 2 || @ Pirates || colspan=6 | Postponed (rain); Makeup: July 27 as a traditional double-header
|- style="background:#bfb"
| 46 || June 4 || @ Cubs || 6–0 || Jim Bunning (5–4) || Larry Jackson (3–6) || None || 3,497 || 21–25
|- style="background:#fbb"
| 47 || June 5 || @ Cubs || 8–9 || Lindy McDaniel (2–1) || Gary Wagner (0–1) || None || 6,049 || 21–26
|- style="background:#bfb"
| 48 || June 6 (1) || @ Cubs || 2–1 || Ray Culp (3–2) || Bob Buhl (5–5) || None || see 2nd game || 22–26
|- style="background:#bfb"
| 49 || June 6 (2) || @ Cubs || 10–9 || Gary Wagner (1–1) || Larry Jackson (3–7) || Ed Roebuck (2) || 16,845 || 23–26
|- style="background:#fbb"
| 50 || June 7 || Dodgers || 3–14 || Sandy Koufax (8–3) || Lew Burdette (0–3) || None || 23,345 || 23–27
|- style="background:#fbb"
| 51 || June 8 || Dodgers || 1–2 || Claude Osteen (4–6) || Jim Bunning (5–5) || Ron Perranoski (2) || 14,975 || 23–28
|- style="background:#bfb"
| 52 || June 9 || Dodgers || 7–3 || Chris Short (5–6) || Mike Kekich (0–1) || None || 16,241 || 24–28
|- style="background:#bfb"
| 53 || June 10 || Dodgers || 4–0 || Ray Herbert (3–3) || Johnny Podres (3–2) || None || 19,467 || 25–28
|- style="background:#bfb"
| 54 || June 11 || Astros || 6–5 (10) || Gary Wagner (2–1) || Jim Owens (2–3) || None || 16,825 || 26–28
|- style="background:#bfb"
| 55 || June 12 || Astros || 5–4 || Ed Roebuck (3–2) || Turk Farrell (4–2) || None || 7,870 || 27–28
|- style="background:#bfb"
| 56 || June 13 || Astros || 5–0 || Chris Short (6–6) || Claude Raymond (2–3) || None || 12,936 || 28–28
|- style="background:#fbb"
| 57 || June 15 || @ Braves || 7–12 || Tony Cloninger (9–4) || Art Mahaffey (2–5) || Phil Niekro (2) || 4,065 || 28–29
|- style="background:#bfb"
| 58 || June 16 || @ Braves || 6–2 || Jim Bunning (6–5) || Denny Lemaster (4–6) || None || 3,479 || 29–29
|- style="background:#fbb"
| 59 || June 17 || @ Braves || 2–4 || Billy O'Dell (5–2) || Ray Culp (3–3) || None || 3,674 || 29–30
|- style="background:#bfb"
| 60 || June 18 || @ Dodgers || 4–2 || Chris Short (7–6) || Johnny Podres (3–3) || None || 30,401 || 30–30
|- style="background:#fbb"
| 61 || June 19 || @ Dodgers || 0–4 || Nick Willhite (1–0) || Ray Herbert (3–4) || Ron Perranoski (3) || 20,518 || 30–31
|- style="background:#bfb"
| 62 || June 20 (1) || @ Astros || 3–2 || Jim Bunning (7–5) || Ron Taylor (2–2) || Gary Wagner (1) || see 2nd game || 31–31
|- style="background:#bfb"
| 63 || June 20 (2) || @ Astros || 7–1 || Bo Belinsky (2–3) || Mike Cuellar (0–1) || None || 42,648 || 32–31
|- style="background:#fbb"
| 64 || June 21 || @ Astros || 2–6 || Turk Farrell (5–2) || Ray Culp (3–4) || None || 18,271 || 32–32
|- style="background:#bfb"
| 65 || June 22 || @ Astros || 7–2 || Chris Short (8–6) || Bob Bruce (5–9) || Gary Wagner (2) || 19,331 || 33–32
|- style="background:#bfb"
| 66 || June 24 || @ Giants || 3–1 || Jim Bunning (8–5) || Juan Marichal (11–6) || Ray Herbert (1) || 8,738 || 34–32
|- style="background:#fbb"
| 67 || June 25 || @ Giants || 1–4 || Bob Shaw (7–4) || Bo Belinsky (2–4) || None || 12,948 || 34–33
|- style="background:#fbb"
| 68 || June 26 || @ Giants || 5–6 || Masanori Murakami (1–1) || Gary Wagner (2–2) || None || 18,247 || 34–34
|- style="background:#bfb"
| 69 || June 27 || @ Giants || 6–0 || Ray Culp (4–4) || Bobby Bolin (3–4) || None || 27,015 || 35–34
|- style="background:#bfb"
| 70 || June 28 || Cardinals || 3–0 || Chris Short (9–6) || Tracy Stallard (4–3) || None || 19,208 || 36–34
|- style="background:#bfb"
| 71 || June 29 || Cardinals || 7–1 || Bo Belinsky (3–4) || Bob Purkey (5–6) || None || 19,219 || 37–34
|- style="background:#bfb"
| 72 || June 30 || Braves || 3–2 || Gary Wagner (3–2) || Wade Blasingame (8–6) || None || 17,771 || 38–34
|-

|- style="background:#bfb"
| 73 || July 1 || Braves || 2–1 || Ray Culp (5–4) || Ken Johnson (6–4) || None || 17,792 || 39–34
|- style="background:#bfb"
| 74 || July 2 || Reds || 4–3 || Jack Baldschun (4–1) || Gerry Arrigo (2–4) || None || 22,516 || 40–34
|- style="background:#fbb"
| 75 || July 3 || Reds || 8–10 || Billy McCool (6–5) || Ed Roebuck (3–3) || Roger Craig (3) || 25,152 || 40–35
|- style="background:#fbb"
| 76 || July 4 || Reds || 1–4 || Joe Nuxhall (3–2) || Bo Belinsky (3–5) || None || 14,749 || 40–36
|- style="background:#bfb"
| 77 || July 5 (1) || Pirates || 3–1 || Jim Bunning (9–5) || Bob Veale (8–6) || None || see 2nd game || 41–36
|- style="background:#bfb"
| 78 || July 5 (2) || Pirates || 6–2 || Ed Roebuck (4–3) || Wilbur Wood (0–1) || Gary Wagner (3) || 25,330 || 42–36
|- style="background:#fbb"
| 79 || July 6 || Pirates || 4–8 || Don Cardwell (8–2) || Ray Culp (5–5) || None || 17,357 || 42–37
|- style="background:#bfb"
| 80 || July 7 || Pirates || 1–0 || Chris Short (10–6) || Bob Friend (4–7) || None || 16,632 || 43–37
|- style="background:#fbb"
| 81 || July 8 (1) || Giants || 2–10 || Gaylord Perry (7–7) || Lew Burdette (0–4) || None || see 2nd game || 43–38
|- style="background:#bfb"
| 82 || July 8 (2) || Giants || 4–2 || Ray Herbert (4–4) || Jack Sanford (4–2) || None || 37,110 || 44–38
|- style="background:#bfb"
| 83 || July 9 || Giants || 10–2 || Jim Bunning (10–5) || Jack Sanford (4–3) || None || 27,954 || 45–38
|- style="background:#fbb"
| 84 || July 10 || Giants || 0–7 || Juan Marichal (14–7) || Ray Culp (5–6) || None || 32,031 || 45–39
|- style="background:#bbb"
| – || July 11 || Giants || colspan=6 | Postponed (rain); Makeup: August 31 as a traditional double-header
|- style="background:#bbcaff;"
| – || July 13 ||colspan="7" |1965 Major League Baseball All-Star Game at Metropolitan Stadium in Bloomington
|- style="background:#fbb"
| 85 || July 15 || @ Reds || 1–8 || Joe Nuxhall (6–2) || Chris Short (10–7) || None || 15,606 || 45–40
|- style="background:#fbb"
| 86 || July 16 || @ Reds || 1–5 || Sammy Ellis (13–5) || Jim Bunning (10–6) || None || 18,584 || 45–41
|- style="background:#bfb"
| 87 || July 17 || @ Reds || 14–7 || Ed Roebuck (5–3) || John Tsitouris (5–6) || None || 8,225 || 46–41
|- style="background:#fbb"
| 88 || July 18 || @ Cardinals || 1–3 || Tracy Stallard (7–3) || Bo Belinsky (3–6) || Hal Woodeshick (11) || 18,846 || 46–42
|- style="background:#bfb"
| 89 || July 19 || @ Cardinals || 5–2 || Chris Short (11–7) || Ray Washburn (5–7) || None || 16,571 || 47–42
|- style="background:#fbb"
| 90 || July 20 || @ Cardinals || 3–4 || Curt Simmons (6–9) || Jim Bunning (10–7) || Nelson Briles (1) || 10,108 || 47–43
|- style="background:#fbb"
| 91 || July 21 || @ Cubs || 7–8 (10) || Bob Hendley (1–2) || Bo Belinsky (3–7) || None || 9,585 || 47–44
|- style="background:#fbb"
| 92 || July 22 || @ Cubs || 6–10 || Bob Buhl (10–7) || Ray Herbert (4–5) || Ted Abernathy (20) || 7,468 || 47–45
|- style="background:#fbb"
| 93 || July 23 || @ Mets || 2–3 (10) || Jack Fisher (7–11) || Jack Baldschun (4–2) || None || 38,533 || 47–46
|- style="background:#bfb"
| 94 || July 24 || @ Mets || 5–1 || Jim Bunning (11–7) || Tom Parsons (1–6) || None || 36,921 || 48–46
|- style="background:#fbb"
| 95 || July 25 (1) || @ Mets || 1–8 || Galen Cisco (2–6) || Bo Belinsky (3–8) || Gary Kroll (1) || see 2nd game || 48–47
|- style="background:#bfb"
| 96 || July 25 (2) || @ Mets || 3–1 || Ray Culp (6–6) || Al Jackson (5–13) || None || 36,921 || 49–47
|- style="background:#bfb"
| 97 || July 27 (1) || @ Pirates || 3–1 || Gary Wagner (4–2) || Bob Friend (5–8) || Jack Baldschun (5) || see 2nd game || 50–47
|- style="background:#fbb"
| 98 || July 27 (2) || @ Pirates || 2–3 (10) || Don Schwall (6–3) || Gary Wagner (4–3) || None || 21,832 || 50–48
|- style="background:#bfb"
| 99 || July 28 || @ Pirates || 1–0 (14) || Jack Baldschun (5–2) || Don Schwall (6–4) || None || 13,207 || 51–48
|- style="background:#bfb"
| 100 || July 29 || @ Pirates || 5–0 || Ray Culp (7–6) || Bob Veale (10–8) || None || 10,160 || 52–48
|- style="background:#bfb"
| 101 || July 30 || Mets || 5–3 || Lew Burdette (1–4) || Al Jackson (5–14) || Gary Wagner (4) || 16,429 || 53–48
|- style="background:#fbb"
| 102 || July 31 || Mets || 3–4 (11) || Gary Kroll (6–6) || Jack Baldschun (5–3) || Gordie Richardson (1) || 10,207 || 53–49
|-

|- style="background:#bfb"
| 103 || August 1 || Mets || 3–2 || Jim Bunning (12–7) || Tom Parsons (1–8) || Gary Wagner (5) || 8,935 || 54–49
|- style="background:#fbb"
| 104 || August 3 || Cubs || 0–2 || Bill Faul (2–2) || Ray Culp (7–7) || None || 17,171 || 54–50
|- style="background:#bfb"
| 105 || August 4 || Cubs || 7–2 || Chris Short (12–7) || Bob Buhl (12–8) || None || 13,515 || 55–50
|- style="background:#bfb"
| 106 || August 5 || Cubs || 4–3 || Lew Burdette (2–4) || Dick Ellsworth (12–8) || Bo Belinsky (1) || 14,867 || 56–50
|- style="background:#bfb"
| 107 || August 6 || Pirates || 4–0 || Jim Bunning (13–7) || Bob Friend (5–9) || None || 22,155 || 57–50
|- style="background:#fbb"
| 108 || August 7 || Pirates || 3–4 || Al McBean (4–5) || Ray Culp (7–8) || None || 8,204 || 57–51
|- style="background:#fbb"
| 109 || August 8 (1) || Pirates || 1–7 || Bob Veale (12–8) || Chris Short (12–8) || None || see 2nd game || 57–52
|- style="background:#bfb"
| 110 || August 8 (2) || Pirates || 5–2 || Ray Herbert (5–5) || Tommie Sisk (3–2) || None || 29,260 || 58–52
|- style="background:#fbb"
| 111 || August 9 || @ Astros || 0–8 || Robin Roberts (6–7) || Lew Burdette (2–5) || None || 31,209 || 58–53
|- style="background:#bfb"
| 112 || August 10 || @ Astros || 2–0 || Jim Bunning (14–7) || Bob Bruce (7–15) || None || 24,533 || 59–53
|- style="background:#bfb"
| 113 || August 11 || @ Astros || 5–1 || Ray Culp (8–8) || Danny Coombs (0–1) || None || 28,224 || 60–53
|- style="background:#bfb"
| 114 || August 12 || @ Astros || 7–3 || Chris Short (13–8) || Turk Farrell (8–7) || Ed Roebuck (3) || 22,011 || 61–53
|- style="background:#bfb"
| 115 || August 13 || @ Giants || 3–2 || Bo Belinsky (4–8) || Warren Spahn (5–14) || Gary Wagner (6) || 24,275 || 62–53
|- style="background:#bfb"
| 116 || August 14 || @ Giants || 4–2 || Jim Bunning (15–7) || Juan Marichal (18–9) || Jack Baldschun (6) || 23,087 || 63–53
|- style="background:#fbb"
| 117 || August 15 || @ Giants || 9–15 || Bill Henry (3–1) || Ray Culp (8–9) || Jack Sanford (2) || 26,931 || 63–54
|- style="background:#bfb"
| 118 || August 16 || @ Dodgers || 6–1 || Chris Short (14–8) || Johnny Podres (4–6) || None || 22,611 || 64–54
|- style="background:#fbb"
| 119 || August 17 || @ Dodgers || 2–4 || Claude Osteen (11–11) || Ray Herbert (5–6) || Ron Perranoski (10) || 23,144 || 64–55
|- style="background:#bfb"
| 120 || August 18 || @ Dodgers || 6–3 (12) || Gary Wagner (5–3) || Jim Brewer (2–2) || None || 38,267 || 65–55
|- style="background:#fbb"
| 121 || August 20 || Reds || 2–3 (10) || Sammy Ellis (16–7) || Gary Wagner (5–4) || None || 28,709 || 65–56
|- style="background:#fbb"
| 122 || August 21 || Reds || 1–2 (11) || Joe Nuxhall (10–3) || Jack Baldschun (5–4) || Billy McCool (15) || 10,000 || 65–57
|- style="background:#bfb"
| 123 || August 22 || Reds || 6–5 || Jim Bunning (16–7) || Roger Craig (0–4) || Gary Wagner (7) || 8,431 || 66–57
|- style="background:#fbb"
| 124 || August 24 || Astros || 3–4 || Don Nottebart (4–11) || Gary Wagner (5–5) || None || 13,863 || 66–58
|- style="background:#fbb"
| 125 || August 25 || Astros || 6–7 || Ron Taylor (3–5) || Jack Baldschun (5–5) || Jim Owens (6) || 11,066 || 66–59
|- style="background:#fbb"
| 126 || August 26 || Astros || 4–6 || Dave Giusti (7–5) || Gary Wagner (5–6) || Jim Owens (7) || 21,805 || 66–60
|- style="background:#fbb"
| 127 || August 27 || Dodgers || 8–9 || Don Drysdale (18–11) || Ray Herbert (5–7) || Howie Reed (1) || 26,740 || 66–61
|- style="background:#fbb"
| 128 || August 28 || Dodgers || 4–8 || Jim Brewer (3–2) || Chris Short (14–9) || Sandy Koufax (1) || 27,439 || 66–62
|- style="background:#bfb"
| 129 || August 29 || Dodgers || 13–3 || Ray Culp (9–9) || Claude Osteen (11–13) || None || 21,744 || 67–62
|- style="background:#fbb"
| 130 || August 31 (1) || Giants || 1–2 (11) || Frank Linzy (5–2) || Gary Wagner (5–7) || None || see 2nd game || 67–63
|- style="background:#bfb"
| 131 || August 31 (2) || Giants || 2–0 || Lew Burdette (3–5) || Warren Spahn (6–16) || None || 33,060 || 68–63
|-

|- style="background:#bbb"
| – || September 1 || Giants || colspan=6 | Postponed (rain); Makeup: September 2 as a traditional double-header
|- style="background:#bfb"
| 132 || September 2 (1) || Giants || 4–3 || Chris Short (15–9) || Juan Marichal (19–10) || None || see 2nd game || 69–63
|- style="background:#fbb"
| 133 || September 2 (2) || Giants || 2–5 || Frank Linzy (6–2) || Jack Baldschun (5–6) || None || 30,410 || 69–64
|- style="background:#fbb"
| 134 || September 3 || @ Reds || 7–16 || Roger Craig (1–4) || Grant Jackson (0–1) || None || 11,421 || 69–65
|- style="background:#fbb"
| 135 || September 4 || @ Reds || 4–5 || Joey Jay (9–5) || Jim Bunning (16–8) || None || 17,469 || 69–66
|- style="background:#fbb"
| 136 || September 5 || @ Reds || 9–10 || Billy McCool (9–8) || Jack Baldschun (5–7) || None || 18,119 || 69–67
|- style="background:#fbb"
| 137 || September 6 (1) || @ Cardinals || 3–10 || Tracy Stallard (10–6) || Bo Belinsky (4–9) || None || see 2nd game || 69–68
|- style="background:#bfb"
| 138 || September 6 (2) || @ Cardinals || 10–5 || Chris Short (16–9) || Curt Simmons (9–14) || None || 21,867 || 70–68
|- style="background:#bfb"
| 139 || September 8 || @ Braves || 6–5 || Ray Culp (10–9) || Ken Johnson (15–9) || Chris Short (2) || 3,417 || 71–68
|- style="background:#bbb"
| – || September 9 || @ Braves || colspan=6 | Postponed (rain); Makeup: September 20
|- style="background:#bfb"
| 140 || September 10 || Cardinals || 5–4 (12) || Ferguson Jenkins (1–0) || Hal Woodeshick (6–6) || None || 16,333 || 72–68
|- style="background:#bfb"
| 141 || September 11 || Cardinals || 3–1 || Chris Short (17–9) || Tracy Stallard (10–7) || None || 13,558 || 73–68
|- style="background:#bbb"
| – || September 12 || Cardinals || colspan=6 | Cancelled (rain; Hurricane Betsy); Was not rescheduled
|- style="background:#bfb"
| 142 || September 13 || Braves || 4–3 || Ray Culp (11–9) || Phil Niekro (1–3) || None || 5,647 || 74–68
|- style="background:#bfb"
| 143 || September 14 || Braves || 2–0 || Jim Bunning (17–8) || Hank Fischer (7–7) || None || 11,050 || 75–68
|- style="background:#fbb"
| 144 || September 15 || Braves || 2–4 || Tony Cloninger (22–9) || Chris Short (17–10) || Dan Osinski (5) || 10,932 || 75–69
|- style="background:#bfb"
| 145 || September 16 || Braves || 8–6 || Gary Wagner (6–7) || Denny Lemaster (6–12) || Ferguson Jenkins (1) || 11,336 || 76–69
|- style="background:#fbb"
| 146 || September 17 || @ Pirates || 0–4 || Don Cardwell (12–10) || Ray Culp (11–10) || None || 8,987 || 76–70
|- style="background:#fbb"
| 147 || September 18 || @ Pirates || 3–4 || Roy Face (2–1) || Morrie Steevens (0–1) || None || 5,313 || 76–71
|- style="background:#fbb"
| 148 || September 19 || @ Pirates || 0–1 (10) || Bob Veale (17–11) || Jack Baldschun (5–8) || None || 10,026 || 76–72
|- style="background:#bfb"
| 149 || September 20 || @ Braves || 4–1 || Ray Culp (12–10) || Wade Blasingame (16–10) || None || 812 || 77–72
|- style="background:#fbb"
| 150 || September 21 || @ Cubs || 5–7 || Ted Abernathy (4–4) || Ferguson Jenkins (1–1) || None || 892 || 77–73
|- style="background:#bbb"
| – || September 22 || @ Cubs || colspan=6 | Postponed (rain); Makeup: September 23 as a traditional double-header
|- style="background:#bfb"
| 151 || September 23 (1) || @ Cubs || 11–5 || Jim Bunning (18–8) || Larry Jackson (13–20) || None || see 2nd game || 78–73
|- style="background:#bfb"
| 152 || September 23 (2) || @ Cubs || 7–4 || Chris Short (18–10) || Bill Faul (5–6) || None || 1,598 || 79–73
|- style="background:#bbb"
| – || September 24 || Mets || colspan=6 | Postponed (rain); Makeup: September 25 as a traditional double-header
|- style="background:#bfb"
| 153 || September 25 (1) || Mets || 4–1 || Ray Culp (13–10) || Larry Bearnarth (3–4) || None || see 2nd game || 80–73
|- style="background:#fbb"
| 154 || September 25 (2) || Mets || 1–4 || Carl Willey (1–2) || Ray Herbert (5–8) || None || 6,825 || 80–74
|- style="background:#bfb"
| 155 || September 26 || Mets || 5–4 (10) || Grant Jackson (1–1) || Jack Fisher (8–23) || None || 9,029 || 81–74
|- style="background:#fbb"
| 156 || September 27 || Cubs || 0–1 || Larry Jackson (14–20) || Jim Bunning (18–9) || None || 4,390 || 81–75
|- style="background:#fbb"
| 157 || September 28 || Cubs || 1–2 || Bill Faul (6–6) || Chris Short (18–11) || None || 3,928 || 81–76
|- style="background:#bfb"
| 158 || September 29 || Cubs || 7–6 || Gary Wagner (7–7) || Lindy McDaniel (5–6) || None || 4,609 || 82–76
|-

|- style="background:#bbb"
| – || October 1 || @ Mets || colspan=6 | Postponed (rain); Makeup: October 2 as a traditional double-header
|- style="background:#bfb"
| 159 || October 2 (1) || @ Mets || 6–0 || Jim Bunning (19–9) || Larry Bearnarth (3–5) || None || see 2nd game || 83–76
|- style="background:#fffdd0"
| 160 || October 2 (2) || @ Mets || 0–0 (18) || None || None || None || 10,371 || 83–76–1
|- style="background:#bfb"
| 161 || October 3 (1) || @ Mets || 3–1 || Ray Culp (14–10) || Al Jackson (8–20) || None || see 2nd game || 84–76–1
|- style="background:#bfb"
| 162 || October 3 (2) || @ Mets || 3–1 (13) || Ferguson Jenkins' (2–1) || Jack Fisher (8–24) || None || 18,508 || 85–76–1
|-

 Roster 

 Player stats 

 Batting 

 Starters by position Note: Pos = Position; G = Games played; AB = At bats; H = Hits; Avg. = Batting average; HR = Home runs; RBI = Runs batted in Other batters Note: G = Games played; AB = At bats; H = Hits; Avg. = Batting average; HR = Home runs; RBI = Runs batted in Pitching 

 Starting pitchers Note: G = Games pitched; IP = Innings pitched; W = Wins; L = Losses; ERA = Earned run average; SO = Strikeouts Other pitchers Note: G = Games pitched; IP = Innings pitched; W = Wins; L = Losses; ERA = Earned run average; SO = Strikeouts Relief pitchers Note: G = Games pitched; W = Wins; L = Losses; SV = Saves; ERA = Earned run average; SO = Strikeouts Farm system 

 References 

 External links 
1965 Philadelphia Phillies season at Baseball Reference''

Philadelphia Phillies seasons
Philadelphia Phillies season
Philadelph